Sami is a department or commune of Banwa Province in western Burkina Faso. Its capital lies at the town of Sami. According to the 1996 census the department has a total population of 7,703.

Villages
The largest villages and populations in the department are as follows:

Sami	(340 inhabitants) 
 Bonkorowé	(330 inhabitants)
 Déré	(608 inhabitants)
 Dima	(489 inhabitants)
 Dimibo	(599 inhabitants)
 Priwé	(2 632 inhabitants)
 Sagoéta	(632 inhabitants)
 Seindé	(304 inhabitants)
 Sogodjankoli	(1 769 inhabitants)

References

Departments of Burkina Faso
Banwa Province